Hypsopygia nostralis, the southern hayworm moth, is a species of snout moth. It was described by Achille Guenée in 1854. It has a wide distribution and is found in most of South America, Saint Helena, Réunion, Mauritius, Puerto Rico and in the southern United States, from Texas to Florida and Madagascar

References

Moths described in 1854
Pyralini